The 1972 Cal State Northridge  Matadors football team represented California State University, Northridge as a member of the California Collegiate Athletic Association (CCAA) during the 1972 NCAA College Division football season. Led by Rod Humenuik in his second and final season as head coach, Cal State Northridge compiled an overall record of 6–5 with a mark of 1–3 in conference play, placing fourth in the CCAA. The team outscored its opponents 375 to 192 for the season and allowed under ten points four times. The Matadors played home games at North Campus Stadium in Northridge, California.

Schedule

Team players in the NFL
The following Cal State Northridge players were selected in the 1973 NFL Draft.

References

Cal State Northridge
Cal State Northridge Matadors football seasons
Cal State Northridge Matadors football